Kempen Airport or Budel Airport (Dutch: Vliegveld Kempen), also just called Budel after the nearby town, is a general aviation airport in the south-east of the Netherlands located  west of Weert and near the border with Belgium.

The airport opened in 1970, initially only with a grass runway. Approach and runway lighting followed, making the airport suitable for IFR flights. With around 80,000 movements (a movement being a takeoff or landing) a year, it is amongst the largest general aviation airports in the Netherlands. International flights are allowed to and from the airport and it is used extensively by business aircraft, accounting for 80% of all aircraft movements.

Accidents
On October 26, 2009, a Pilatus PC-12 registered PH-RUL on its way to Frankfurt Egelsbach Airport crashed in a field shortly after take-off from Kempen Airport's Runway 21. The two people on board died. An investigation was performed by the Dutch Safety Board however the cause of the accident was never conclusively determined. The aircraft was new, having had its first flight in May that same year.

References

External links
Kempen Airport official website
Airliners.net - Photos taken at Kempen Airport

Airports in North Brabant
Cranendonck